Charlie Martin McNeill (born 9 September 2003) is an English professional footballer who plays as a centre-forward for  club Newport County, on loan from  side Manchester United.

Early life
Born in Droylsden, McNeill started his career with Manchester United, who he supported growing up, before leaving for city rivals Manchester City in 2014. While with City, McNeill scored over 600 goals at youth level.

Club career

Manchester United
In 2020, Manchester United agreed a deal for McNeill worth a reported £750,000. He continued his prolific form that made him a highly regarded prospect at Manchester City, scoring 24 goals in 21 games in his first season with the United U18 squad.

He made his debut for United's first team as a substitute in the UEFA Europa League match against Real Sociedad on 8 September 2022, the day before his 19th birthday.

On 31 January 2023, McNeill signed for League Two club Newport County on loan until the end of the 2022–23 season. He made his Newport debut in the starting line-up for the League Two 2-1 win against Swindon Town on 4 February 2023. He scored his first goal for Newport in the 3-1 League Two win against Tranmere Rovers on 18 March 2023.

Sponsorship
McNeill has a contract with German brand Adidas, which could reportedly rise to a value of £1 million.

Career statistics

Honours
Manchester United U18
FA Youth Cup: 2021–22

External links

References

2003 births
Living people
English footballers
England youth international footballers
Association football forwards
Liverpool F.C. players
Manchester United F.C. players
Manchester City F.C. players
Newport County A.F.C. players
English Football League players